The 5th constituency of Ille-et-Vilaine is a French legislative constituency in the Ille-et-Vilaine département. Like the other 576 French constituencies, it elects one MP using the two-round system, with a run-off if no candidate receives over 50% of the vote in the first round.

Deputies

Election results

2022

 
 
 
 
 
 
 
|-
| colspan="8" bgcolor="#E9E9E9"|
|-

2017

2012

2007

2002

1997

1993

Sources

 INSEE's slip of this constituency: 

 Liste of Ille-et-Vilaine's deputies from 1789: 

 Official results of French elections from 1998: 

5